Hyperandra is a genus of moths in the family Erebidae. The genus was erected by George Hampson in 1901.

Species
Hyperandra appendiculata
Hyperandra diminuta
Hyperandra excavata
Hyperandra novata
Hyperandra porioni

References

 , 2008, "Contribution to the knowledge of neotropical Arctiinae. IV. New combination and synonymy within the genus Hyperandra Hampson, 1901 (Lepidoptera: Arctiidae: Arctiinae: Phaegopterini)" Lambillionea CVIII, 3 septembre: 358–361.
 , 2001: Description de nouvelles Arctiides néotropicales et d'un nouveau genre (Lepidoptera: Arctiidae: Arctiinae) 68ème note. Nouvelle Revue d'Entomologie 18 (2): 113–121.

External links

Phaegopterina
Moth genera